Iva or IVA may refer to:

Organizations
 Independent Voters Association, a North Dakota U.S. political organization
 Informationsvidenskabelige Akademi, a Danish university
 Royal Swedish Academy of Engineering Sciences, (Swedish: Kungliga Ingenjörsvetenskapsakademien)
 International Volleyball Association, a former co-ed professional volleyball league in the United States

Places
 Iva, Indiana, an unincorporated community in the United States
 Iva, South Carolina, a town in the United States
 Iva, Iran (disambiguation), places in Iran
 Iva, Samoa, a village

Science, medicine and technology
Interactive visual analysis, a methodology for visual exploration and data mining of complex data sets
Intravenous anesthesia, a type of anesthesia
IVA Communications satellite — see List of Intelsat satellites
Intelligent virtual agent in artificial intelligence
Intelligent virtual assistant, a software agent that can perform tasks based on commands or questions

Chemical Elements
 IVA, the old IUPAC name for what is now IUPAC Group 4
 IVA, the CAS name for IUPAC Group 14

see Group (periodic table)

Weather
 Hurricane Iva (1961)
 Tropical Storm Iva (1968)
 Tropical Storm Iva (1972)
 Hurricane Iva (1976)
 Hurricane Iva (1978)
 Tropical Storm Iva (1982)
 Hurricane Iva (1988)

see Hurricane Iva (disambiguation)

Biology
 Iva (plant), a plant genus in the family Asteraceae
 Iva (copepod), a former crustacean genus in the family Pontellidae
 Isovaleric acidemia, an autosomal recessive metabolic disorder

Finance
 Individual Voluntary Arrangement, in the United Kingdom, an alternative to bankruptcy
 Value-added tax, known as IVA in Italian language (for "Imposta sul Valore Aggiunto"), in Spanish language (for "Impuesto al Valor Agregado") or in Portuguese language ("Imposto sobre o Valor Agregado" or "Imposto sobre o Valor Acrescentado") 
 Gross Value Added, specifically 'industry value added', a financial metric

People
 Iva (given name)
 Kaia Iva (born 1964), Estonian politician
 Iva Davies (born 1955), Australian singer/songwriter, lead singer for Icehouse
 IVA (born 1978), operatic singer-songwriter

Other
 Individual Vehicle Approval, a kind of motor vehicle type approval
 Iva (film), a 1993 film by Izu Ojukwu
 Iva, meaning “yes” in Maltese

See also
 497 Iva, asteroid
 Stalag IV-A, a German World War II POW camp in Saxony

Genus disambiguation pages